Keyapaha is an unincorporated community in Tripp County, South Dakota, United States. Keyapaha is southwest of Colome and south of New Witten.

The community took its name from the Keya Paha River. The name "Keya Paha" is taken from the Sioux language; literally translated, it means "turtle hill".

References

Unincorporated communities in Tripp County, South Dakota
Unincorporated communities in South Dakota